Andrew Garrett may refer to:

 Andrew Garrett (explorer) (1823–1887), American explorer, naturalist and illustrator
 Andrew Garrett (linguist), American professor of linguistics at the University of California, Berkeley